Johannes Scheuter (8 November 1880 – 7 August 1944) was a Dutch sports shooter. He competed in the 600 m free rifle event at the 1924 Summer Olympics.

References

External links
 

1880 births
1944 deaths
Dutch male sport shooters
Olympic shooters of the Netherlands
Shooters at the 1924 Summer Olympics
Sportspeople from Amersfoort